Medical center or medical centre may refer to:

Medical care 
 A collection of medical services on the same site, such as the services of a general practitioner, pharmacist, pathology, radiology, dentist etc.
 Clinic
 Hospital
 Academic medical centre, often including hospitals, research facilities, medical schools, and/or other health care facilities
 Centro Medico Excel in Tijuana, Mexico
 Centro Medico (Guatemala)

Transit 
Medical Center station (disambiguation), transit stations of the name

Other 
Medical Center (TV series), a 1969-1976 medical drama series on CBS

See also
Illinois Medical District, a neighborhood in the Near West Side community area of Chicago, Illinois alternatively known as Medical Center
Illinois Medical District station, a station on the Chicago Transit Authority's Blue Line serving the above neighborhood; previously known as Medical Center
Tufts Medical Center (MBTA station), a subway and BRT station in Boston commonly referred to as Medical Center